Diane E. Mitsch Bush (born February 17, 1950) is an American politician and retired sociology professor who served as a member of the Colorado House of Representatives. She was the Democratic nominee for the U.S. House of Representatives in the 2018 and 2020 elections in Colorado's 3rd congressional district, both of which she was defeated in.

Early life and education

Mitsch Bush graduated with a BA in sociology in 1975. She later earned a Master of Arts and PhD in sociology and social policy, both from the University of Minnesota.

Career 
Prior to 2012, Mitsch Bush served as a commissioner of Routt County, Colorado. She then served as a member of the Colorado House of Representatives for the 26th district from January 9, 2013, to November 2, 2017, after which she resigned to focus on her campaign for Congress.

In 2013, Mitsch Bush voted for universal background checks and magazine limits in Colorado.

In 2016, Mitsch Bush co-sponsored and voted to require state contractors to comply with federal equal pay standards.

Mitsch Bush sponsored the bipartisan Debt-free Schools Act in Colorado in 2016, later signed by the governor, to increase public school funding in Colorado.

Mitsch Bush served as a member on the Colorado House Committee for Agriculture, Livestock, and Natural Resources from 2013-2017, serving as the Vice Chair in 2017.

2018 U.S. House election

In July 2017, Mitsch Bush announced her candidacy for the congressional seat held by Scott Tipton, and won the Democratic nomination in June 2018. She was defeated in the general election by Tipton by eight percentage points.

2020 U.S. House election

Mitsch Bush was the nominee in the 2020 election after defeating seafood executive James Iacino. She faced Lauren Boebert, a restaurant owner from Rifle, Colorado, who defeated Tipton in the Republican primary. She lost the November 3, 2020 general election by five percentage points.

Personal life 
Mitsch Bush has lived in Steamboat Springs, Colorado since 1976. Mitsch Bush is married to Michael Paul.

Elections
2012 When Democratic Representative Andy Kerr ran for the Colorado Senate and left the 26th district seat open, Mitsch Bush was unopposed for the June 26, 2012, Democratic primary, winning with 1,738 votes; and won the November 6, 2012, general election with 18,470 votes (55.8%) against Republican nominee Charles McConnell.
2018 During the Democratic primary for Colorado's 3rd district that took place on June 26, 2018, Mitsch Bush defeated two Democratic opponents, Karl Hanlon and Arn Menconi, to win the primary with 42,048 votes (64.12%). Incumbent congressman Scott Tipton defeated her in the general election.
2020 Mitsch Bush was defeated by Lauren Boebert by six percent on November 3, 2020, 51.27% to 45.41%.  Boebert raised $2.4 million and Mitsch Bush raised $4.2 million.  Republican groups spent more than $5 million. Democratic groups spent nearly $4 million.

References

External links

Official page at the Colorado General Assembly
Diane for Colorado campaign website

1950 births
21st-century American politicians
21st-century American women politicians
Living people
Democratic Party members of the Colorado House of Representatives
People from Steamboat Springs, Colorado
Politicians from Saint Paul, Minnesota
University of Minnesota College of Liberal Arts alumni
Women state legislators in Colorado
Candidates in the 2018 United States elections
Candidates in the 2020 United States elections